Kalidos mangokyanus is a species of air-breathing land snail, a terrestrial pulmonate gastropod mollusk in the family Helicarionidae.

Distribution 
This species occurs in Madagascar.

References

External links

Helicarionidae
Gastropods described in 1965